Herina ghilianii is a species of ulidiid or picture-winged fly in the genus Herina of the family Ulidiidae found in 
Italy, Malta, and Morocco.

References

Ulidiidae
Insects described in 1869
Diptera of Europe
Taxa named by Camillo Rondani